Ainhoa Fernández Ruiz (born 26 June 1994) is a Spanish-born Andorran football retired player and current referee. She played as a goalkeeper and has been a member the Andorra women's national team.

Club career
Fernández has played for ENFAF in Andorra.

International career
Fernández has been capped for the Andorra national team, appearing for the team during the 2019 FIFA Women's World Cup qualifying cycle.

See also
List of Andorra women's international footballers

References

External links
 
 
 
 

1994 births
Living people
People with acquired Andorran citizenship
Andorran women's footballers
Women's association football goalkeepers
Andorra women's international footballers
Women association football referees
Andorran people of Spanish descent
Andorran people of Catalan descent
Lesbian sportswomen
LGBT association football players
Andorran LGBT people
Spanish women's footballers
Footballers from Barcelona
Spanish football referees
Spanish people of Andorran descent
Spanish LGBT sportspeople
21st-century LGBT people